Alice Catherine Cleaver (1889-1984) was a survivor of the  and nursemaid for the Allison family, wealthy insurance moguls from Canada during the early 20th century. She is best known for rescuing the youngest Allison child, Trevor, from the Titanic. Little is known about her later life, as she refused to give interviews after surviving the shipwreck. She was the subject of books and movies that misidentified her as Alice Mary Cleaver, a woman who was infamous for murdering her own infant.

Early life 
Alice Catherine Cleaver was born in London on 5 July 1889. Her father Joseph Cleaver was a postman, and her mother was Lavinia Alice Cleaver (maiden name Thomas).

Work 
When she was 22, Cleaver was hired by the Allison family to be a nursemaid for their youngest child, Trevor. She traveled first class on the Titanic with them (under ticket No. 113781) and boarded in Southampton. She stayed in the same room as Trevor so that she could care for him, which was right next to the parents in first class.

Night of the shipwreck 
On 14 April 1912 the RMS Titanic struck an iceberg and started to sink. Cleaver took Trevor into her lifeboat, but didn't tell anyone. Speculation claims this confusion could have led to the Allison family perishing, as the mother Bess would not want to leave her son behind. Testimony from that night has speculated why she never alerted the Allisons to her departure from her room, but Cleaver herself never spoke of the incident.

Identity 
There has been some confusion over the age and identity of Alice Cleaver, with some mistaking her for Alice Mary Cleaver, a woman who was convicted in 1909 for the murder of her own child. This misconception was printed as fact in at least two books about the sinking of the Titanic, Titanic: An Illustrated History (1992) and Titanic: Women and Children First  (1998), and was included as part of the plot for the 1996 television mini-series Titanic. In the miniseries Cleaver was portrayed by Felicity Waterman as an emotionally unstable young woman with premonitions of the disaster, who then sees the opportunity to rescue baby Trevor from the sinking ship as a saving grace from her tumultuous past.

Cleaver's age has also been debated due to descriptions of her being a competent nursemaid and a good maternal figure, which Titanic Lives author Rob Rondeau believes were indicative of an older woman.

References

External links 
 Encyclopedia Titanica - Miss Alice Catherine Cleaver

RMS Titanic survivors
Year of death missing
1889 births
Shipwreck survivors
Working class women
British emigrants to Canada
Canadian expatriates in England